The Silence of the Mole (Spanish: El silencio del topo) is a 2021 Guatemalan documentary film directed by Anaïs Taracena (in her directorial debut) and written by Taracena & Pedro G. García. It tells the story of the journalist Elías Barahona, better known as The Mole, who between 1976 and 1980 was infiltrated as press secretary of the Guatemalan Ministry of the Interior. It was selected as the Guatemalan entry in the Best International Film at the 95th Academy Awards, but was not nominated.

Synopsis 
Throughout the 1970s, journalist Elías Barahona, alias El Topo (The Mole), infiltrated the heart of one of Guatemala's most repressive governments. By revealing the story of this reserved and unique individual, The Silence of the Mole captures the moments when revelations from the past open cracks in the walls of silence of a story that remains hidden.

Release 
The film had its world premiere at the end of April 2021 at the Hot Docs Canadian International Documentary Festival 2021 in Toronto, Canada. The film was released commercially on June 2, 2022, in Guatemalan theaters. It had a limited release on February 10, 2023, in Mexican theaters.

Awards

References

External links 

 

2021 films
2021 documentary films
Guatemalan documentary films
2020s Spanish-language films
Documentaries about politics
2021 directorial debut films